Henry Fenton may refer to:

Henry Fenton (MP) (fl. 1416), MP for Stafford
Henry John Horstman Fenton, chemist

See also
Harry Fenton (disambiguation)